The Kuki National Organisation is a conglomeration of various armed groups of the Kuki people.

Geneva Call
KNO is a part of the Geneva Call for "respect of international humanitarian norms, in particular those related to the protection of civilians in armed conflict".

References

Independence movements
Kuki tribes
Rebel groups in Myanmar